Ram Prasad Chaudhary (born 15 November 1954) is an Indian politician and a member of the 9th Lok Sabha, 12th, 13th, 14th, 15th and 16th Legislative Assembly of Uttar Pradesh. He represents the Kaptanganj constituency of Uttar Pradesh and is a member of the Samajwadi Party. He earlier also served as Minister of State (Independent charge) in Mayawati cabinet (1997), Minister of Textile and silk industry in Kalyan Singh government (1997) and Minister of Food and Civil Supplies in Mayawati cabinet (2007–2012).

Early life and education
Chaudhary was born 15 November 1954 in Jigna village in the Basti district of Uttar Pradesh to father Manik Ram Chaudhary. In 1978, he attained Diploma in civil and electrical engineering from Government Polytechnic College, Basti. Chaudhary is married to Kapura Devi, with whom he has a son and two daughters. His nephew Arvind Kumar Chaudhary has been also an MP from Basti (Lok Sabha constituency) from 2009 to 2014 as a member of Bahujan Samaj Party.

Political career
Chaudhary started career as a Member of parliament in 9th Lok Sabha from Khalilabad of Sant Kabir Nagar district as a member of Janata Party. After 1993 he was regular five time continuously MLA of Kaptanganj (Assembly constituency) of Basti district till 2017.

In Seventeenth Legislative Assembly of Uttar Pradesh (2017) elections, he lost to Bhartiya Janata Party candidate Chandra Prakash Shukla by a margin of 6,827 votes.

In 2019 general elections, he was candidate of SP and BSP (Mahagathbandhan) from Basti Lok Sabha seat. But he lost the election to BJP's Harish Dwivedi by a margin of 30,354 (2.88℅) votes.

In November 2019, BSP supremo Mayawati expelled Chaudhary and three former MLAs from the party for indiscipline and anti-party activities. After the expulsion, Chaudhary joined the Samajwadi Party along with his colleagues in the presence of Samajwadi Party president Akhilesh Yadav in Lucknow.

Posts held

References

1954 births
Living people
Uttar Pradesh MLAs 2012–2017
Uttar Pradesh MLAs 2007–2012
Uttar Pradesh MLAs 2002–2007
People from Basti district
20th-century Indian politicians
Bharatiya Janata Party politicians from Uttar Pradesh
Bahujan Samaj Party politicians from Uttar Pradesh
Samajwadi Party politicians from Uttar Pradesh
Uttar Pradesh MLAs 1993–1996
Uttar Pradesh MLAs 1997–2002